Cheshmeh Kabud (also Romanized as Cheshmeh Kabūd and Chashmeh Kabūd; also known as Cheshmeh Kubūd) is a village in Abrumand Rural District, in the Central District of Bahar County, Hamadan Province, Iran. At the 2006 census, its population was 44, in 12 families.

References 

Populated places in Bahar County